B33 may refer to:
 Bundesstraße 33, a German road
 Strathalbyn Road, a road in South Australia
 XB-33 Super Marauder, an experimental aircraft
 Horsehead Nebula, astronomical designation B33
 Avia B-33, a Czech built Ilyushin Il-10